was the 63rd emperor of Japan, according to the traditional order of succession.

Reizei's reign spanned the years from 967 through 969, ending with his abdication and retirement.

Biography
Before his ascension to the Chrysanthemum Throne, his personal name (his imina) was Norihira-shinnō (憲平親王).

Norihira-shinnō was the second son of Emperor Murakami. His mother, Empress Yasuko, was a daughter of minister of the right Fujiwara no Morosuke.  Soon after his birth he was appointed as crown prince, displacing the Emperor's first-born son with the daughter of Fujiwara no Motokata. This decision was supposedly made under the influence of Morosuke and his brother Fujiwara no Saneyori who had seized power in the court. Motokata soon died, in despair at having lost the prospect of being grandfather to the next emperor. The malevolent influence of Motokata's  was blamed for Norihira-shinnō'''s mental illness, which resulted in Saneyori acting as regent for the duration of his short reign.

From ancient times, there have been four noble clans, the Gempeitōkitsu (源平藤橘).  One of these clans, the Minamoto clan (源氏) are also known as Genji, and of these, the Reizei Genji (冷泉源氏) are descended from 63rd emperor Reizei.

Events of Reizei's reign
Questions about mental illness made Norihira-shinnōs succession somewhat problematic.

In 967 his father Murakami died and Reizei ascended to the throne at the age of eighteen.

 July 5, 967 (Kōhō 4, 25th day of the 5th month): In the 16th year of Emperor Murakami's reign (村上天皇十六年), he died; and the succession (‘‘senso’’) was received by his second son.   Shortly thereafter, Emperor Reizei is said to have acceded to the throne (‘‘sokui’’).
 969 (Anna 2): Reizei abdicated; and he took the honorific title of Reizei-in Jōkō. His reign lasted for just two years;  and he lived another 44 years in retirement.

 November 21, 1011' (Kankō 8, 24th day of the 10th month):  Daijō-tennō Reizei-in Jōkō died at age 62.

The actual site of Reizei's grave is known.  This emperor is traditionally venerated at a memorial Shinto shrine (misasagi) at Kyoto.

The Imperial Household Agency designates this location as Reizei's mausoleum.  It is formally named Sakuramoto no misasagiKugyō
 is a collective term for the very few most powerful men attached to the court of the Emperor of Japan in pre-Meiji eras.

In general, this elite group included only three to four men at a time.  These were hereditary courtiers whose experience and background would have brought them to the pinnacle of a life's career.  During Go-Toba's reign, this apex of the  Daijō-kan included:
 Kampaku,  Ōno-no-miya Fujiwara no Saneyori (藤原実頼), 900–970.
 Daijō-daijin, Fujiwara Saneyori.
 Sadaijin, Minamoto no Takaakira (源高明) (relegated in 969 by Anna Incident)
 Sadaijin, Fujiwara Morotada (藤原師尹)
 Udaijin, Fujiwara Morotada (藤原師尹), 920–969.
 Naidaijin (not appointed)
 Dainagon, Fujiwara no Arihira (藤原在衡)
 Dainagon, Minamoto no Kaneakira (源兼明)
 Dainagon, Fujiwara no Koretada (藤原伊尹)

Eras of Reizei's reign
The years of Reizei's reign are more specifically identified by more than one :
 Kōhō (964–968)
 Anna (968–970)

Consorts and children
Empress (Chūgū): Imperial Princess Masako (昌子内親王) later Kanon'in taigō (観音院太后), Emperor Suzaku’s daughter
 Adopted Son: Imperial Prince Nagahira (永平親王; 965–988)

Consort (Nyōgo): Fujiwara no Kaishi/Chikako (藤原懐子, 945–975), Fujiwara no Koretada’s daughter
First Daughter: Imperial Princess Sōshi (宗子内親王; 964–986)
Second Daughter: Imperial Princess Sonshi (尊子内親王; 966–985), 15th Saiin in Kamo Shrine 968–975; later, married to Emperor En'yū in 980
First Son: Imperial Prince Morosada (師貞親王) later Emperor Kazan

Consort (Nyōgo): Fujiwara no Chōshi/Tōko (藤原超子; d.982), Fujiwara no Kaneie’s daughter
Third Daughter: Imperial Princess Mitsuko (光子内親王; 973–975)
Second Son: Imperial Prince Okisada (居貞親王) later Emperor Sanjō
Third son: Imperial Prince Tametaka (為尊親王; 977–1002)
Fourth Son: Imperial Prince Atsumichi (敦道親王; 981–1007)

Consort (Nyōgo): Fujiwara no Fushi/Yoshiko (藤原怤子), Fujiwara no Morosuke’s daughter

Ancestry

Notes

References
 Brown, Delmer M. and Ichirō Ishida, eds. (1979).  Gukanshō: The Future and the Past. Berkeley: University of California Press. ;  OCLC 251325323
 Kitagawa, Hiroshi and Bruce T. Tsuchida. (1975). The Tale of the Heike. Tokyo: University of Tokyo Press.   OCLC 262297615
 Ponsonby-Fane, Richard Arthur Brabazon. (1959).  The Imperial House of Japan. Kyoto: Ponsonby Memorial Society. OCLC 194887
 Titsingh, Isaac. (1834). Nihon Odai Ichiran''; ou,  Annales des empereurs du Japon.  Paris: Royal Asiatic Society, Oriental Translation Fund of Great Britain and Ireland.  OCLC 5850691
 Varley, H. Paul. (1980). Jinnō Shōtōki: A Chronicle of Gods and Sovereigns. New York: Columbia University Press. ;  OCLC 59145842

See also
 Emperor of Japan
 List of Emperors of Japan
 Imperial cult
 Emperor Go-Reizei

Japanese emperors
950 births
1011 deaths
People of Heian-period Japan
10th-century Japanese monarchs
11th-century Japanese people
Japanese retired emperors
People from Kyoto